Gowd Ab Ashtar (also Romanized as Gowd Āb Āshtar) is a village in Bahman Rural District, in the Central District of Abadeh County, Fars Province, Iran. At the 2006 census, its population was 10, in 5 families.

References 

Populated places in Abadeh County